The Arab Cup Winners' Cup was a seasonal association football competition established from 1989 to 2001 for winning clubs of national cup competitions of the 22 Union of Arab Football Associations member associations.

List of finals

Performances

By club

* Al-Gharafa SC (ex. Al-Ittihad SC)

By country

By continent

References

finals
Arab